The freely reusable public information licence (French:Licence information publique librement réutilisable or LIP) is a public copyright license, created 2 April 2010, that permits the free and open reuse, commercially or not, of information released by a French public institution, on condition of respecting article 12 of the law of 17 July 1978. Not all French public sector information is placed under this license; Anne Fauconnier of the state intellectual property agency specifies that this LIP is and remains strictly reserved to certain information published by the Ministry of Justice (France).

Description 

The logo of this licence strongly resembles those of Creative Commons licences since it is arranged according to the terms of the CC-by-sa 2.0 licence. It is more strict, though, in that it requires a documents' "meaning be not transformed, and that their sources and their update dates be mentioned,", which makes it closer to the Creative Commons No-Derivatives License, rather than the Share-Alike License.

See also 
Creative Commons Licence
GNU General Public Licence
Law of France

References

External links
 La LIP sur Répertoire des informations publiques du Ministère de la Justice français
 Peut-on diffuser des données publiques sous licences libres et ouvertes ?, par Thomas Saint-Aubin, chargé d’enseignement et chef du bureau de la stratégie éditoriale du ministère de la Justice

Public copyright licenses